Atnyash (Ätnäş) is a rural locality (a selo) in Novoberdyashsky Selsoviet, Karaidelsky District, Bashkortostan, Russia. The population was 584 as of 2010. There are 12 streets.

Geography 
Atnyash is located 59 km southeast of Karaidel (the district's administrative centre) by road. Mata is the nearest rural locality.

References 

Rural localities in Karaidelsky District